Dietrich VII (1256–1305) was Count of Cleves from 1275 through 1305. He was the son of Dietrich VI, Count of Cleves and his wife Aleidis von Heinsberg.

The County of Cleves was a comital polity of the Holy Roman Empire in present Germany (part of North Rhine-Westphalia) and the Netherlands (parts of Limburg, North Brabant and Gelderland).  Its rulers, called counts, had a special and privileged standing in the Empire. The County of Cleves  was first mentioned in the 11th century. In 1417, the county became a duchy and its rulers were raised to the status of Dukes.

Its history is closely related to that of its neighbours: the Duchies of Jülich, Berg and Guelders and the County of Mark. In 1368, Cleves and Mark were united. In 1521 Jülich, Berg, Cleves and Mark formed the United Duchies of Jülich-Cleves-Berg.  The territory was situated on both sides of the river Rhine, around its capital Cleves and roughly covering today's districts of Cleves, Wesel and the city of Duisburg.

Marriage and Issue

In 1260, Dietrich married Margaret of Guelders (d. 1281), daughter of Otto II, Count of Guelders. They had three children:
 Otto, Count of Cleves (1278–1310)
 Catharine, nun at Gräfenthal (1280-1357)
 Adelheid, married Henry IV, Count of Waldeck (d. 1348)

His second marriage was to Margaret of Habsburg, daughter of Everhard I of Kiburg-Laufenburg. Their children were:
 Dietrich VIII, Count of Cleves (1291–1347)
 Johann, Count of Cleves (1293–1368).
 Margaret, married Henry of Lodi, son of Guy, Count of Flanders (d. 1337)
 Irmgard, married Gerhard I of Horn, Count of Altena (1297-1350)
 Agnes (d. 1361), married in 1312 Count Adolf IX of Berg (d. 1348)
 Maria, nun in Bedburg (1302-1347)
 Eberhard (1303-1312)
 Anna (d. 1378), married Godfrey IV of Cuyck-Arnsberg (d. 1371)

References

Counts of Cleves
1256 births
1305 deaths